Oren Rosenfeld is an Multi-Emmy Award winning Israeli documentary filmmaker, photojournalist, and film producer.

Career 
Rosenfeld was born in Jerusalem on January 29, 1976. He started his career as a photojournalist covering the 2nd Palestinian Intifada. 
In October 2016, he Directed and co-wrote Israel's Arab Warriors for the BBC. In the film, he and cowriter Jane Corbin followed the first unit of Israeli Arab soldiers to serve in the West Bank.

Rosenfeld's award-winning film Hummus The Movie stirred controversy when the Guinness Book of World records refused to send representatives to judge the world's largest plate of hummus due to alleged security concerns.

In 2017 Rosenfeld joined Jane Corbin to write and Direct  The Real Fauda, a BBC documentary about the real story behind the hit Netflix drama Fauda.

Rosenfeld discussed the nature of the documentary, and the uniqueness of the project for I24 News

In early 2018, Rosenfeld returned to India to continue production of Mumbai Jews a film about the long established Jewish community in Mumbai, and the significance or their cultural, social and political contributions to India.

Mumbai Jews touches the story of Moshe Holtzberg, one of the survivors of the 2008 Mumbai terror attacks. He was almost two years old when the attack orphaned him. Rosenfeld follows his return, 10 years later. The story focuses on Holtzberg's nanny Sandra Samuel
In 2010 Oren Founded his production company Holy-Land Productions.

Rosenfeld's latest work Lost in Paradise Goa won the LIAFF award for Best Short Documentary.

In 2022 Rosenfeld won his second Emmy Award for his camera work for Vice News Battle for Jerusalem.

References

External links 

 
 Profile on National Geographic
 Oren Rosenfeld seeks the Humanity of Hummus
 Guinness Book of Records Won’t Send Judge to Israel for 15 Ton Hummus Plate Record Attempt
 Hummus and the Wild, Wild Middle East
 Hummus the Movie at the New York Jewish Film Festival
 Filmmakers Michal Lee Sapir and Oren Rosenfeld in person for Screening of Hummus the Movie
 Oren Rosenfeld's Hummus! The Movie, in its Chicago premiere

Israeli documentary film directors
Israeli photojournalists
Living people
1976 births
Israeli film directors
Israeli film producers
People from Jerusalem